Syed Ali Nasir Saeed Abaqati Musavi, known as Roohul Millat and Agha Roohi, is a Shia cleric from Lucknow, India.

Family background
Syed Ali Nasir Saeed Abaqati popularly known as Agha Roohi is a Shia scholar from Lucknow, India and comes from the family of Syed Mir Hamid Hussain Musavi whose book `Abaqat al'anwar fi imamat al 'A'immat al'athar is popular among Twelver Shi'a scholars worldwide, and quoted even today.

He belongs to the lineage of Syed Mohammad Quli Khan.

His family is renowned and respected in Lucknow, where his father Saeed-ul-Millat  Syed Mohammad Saeed and grandfather Syed Nasir-ul-Millat enjoyed much respect in their lifetimes. His ancestral town is Kintoor, Barabanki, Uttar Pradesh and he traces his lineage to Muhammad via Imam Musa al-Kazim, hence the name "Musavi".

He is the first cousin of khateeb ul imaan, sher e Hindustan marhoom Tahir Jarwali.

He has two younger brothers Syed Husain Nasir Saeed Abaqati and Syed Sajjad Nasir Saeed Abaqati. He has two sons Syed Abbas Nasir Saeed Abaqati and Syed Murtaza Nasir Saeed Abaqati and currently resides in the famous Nasirya Library in Lucknow. His only Sister is married to famous Urdu Poet Kazim Jarwali.

His majalis (religious lectures)
Agha Roohi recites the ashra-e-majalis (religious lecture to commemorate the Martyrdom of Imam Hussain, spanning ten days) at Shia PG College (at Victoria Street in Nakhas) in morning and at Afzal Mahal in evening.

He is an exponent of Tabarra, openly curse the enemies of Hussainiyat, the killers of Imam Hussain.

Involvement in community matters, demonstrations and rallies
 He has been involved in issue related to Mazar-e-Shahid Salis in Agra.
 In 2006 he was removed from the board of Shia college, Lucknow.
 In May 2006 he opposed 'new model nikahnama' for the Shia community issued by All India Shia Personal Law Board, headed by Maulana Mirza Mohammed Athar.
 He held al-Qaeda responsible for 2006–2007 destruction of the Al-Askari Mosque in Samarra, Iraq.
 In 2009 Law Commission's report on bigamy resulted in opposition from All India Muslim Personal Law Board, Agha Roohi suggested Law Commission to talk to clerics over this issue.
 On 14 November 2010 he and fellow cleric Kalbe Jawad tried to stop the annual meeting of the board of trustees at Shia Post Graduate Degree College because it was being held on a Sunday. The men were taken into preventive custody but were released when violent protests broke out.
 In Apr 2017, he issued a statement forbidding cow slaughter.

Syed Abbas Nasir Saeed Abqati

His son Syed Abbas Nasir Saeed Abqati (b. 1986), a PhD student in Shia theology, fought against the Islamic State in Iraq and Syria (ISIS, or IS) while he was studying at Najaf University (Al-Hawza al-'Ilmiyya fi al-Najaf al-Ashraf Islamic seminary) in July 2014 when clashes with the ISIS broke out in Iraq. Apart from other majalis he now addresses majlis at Shia College during first 10 days of Muharram.

See also
 Islamic scholars

References

External links 
 Shia Sunni clash in Lucknow during Muharram, 18 December 2010 – 11:04 pm

Year of birth missing (living people)
Living people
21st-century Muslim scholars of Islam
Scholars from Lucknow
Ali Nasir Saeed
Indian Shia Muslims
Indian Shia clerics
Indian Islamic religious leaders